Richard Schröder (born April 14, 1921) was an SS-Unterscharführer and member of staff at Auschwitz concentration camp. He was prosecuted at the Auschwitz Trial.

Born in Hamburg, Schröder completed trade school to work as a freight forwarder. He joined the Hitler Youth on October 1, 1933, the Nazi Party on December 1, 1939, and the SS on May 30, 1940. He was assigned to Auschwitz in December 1940, where he worked as an accounting officer until January 1945. Because he had only clerical duties, he had no contact with prisoners. Schröder was tried by the Supreme National Tribunal in Kraków and convicted of being part of a criminal organisation (the SS and Auschwitz staff). He received a 10-year prison sentence, but was released in the mid-1950s under an amnesty.

Bibliography 
 Cyprian T., Sawicki J., Siedem wyroków Najwyższego Trybunału Narodowego, Poznań 1962

1921 births
Possibly living people
People convicted in the Auschwitz trial
SS non-commissioned officers
Auschwitz concentration camp personnel
Military personnel from Hamburg
Hitler Youth members
Nazi Party members

German people convicted of crimes against humanity